The women's 100 metres hurdles event at the 1986 European Athletics Championships was held in Stuttgart, then West Germany, at Neckarstadion on 27, 28, and 29 August 1986.

Medalists

Results

Final
29 August
Wind: -0.7 m/s

Semi-finals
28 August

Semi-final 1
Wind: 0 m/s

Semi-final 2
Wind: 0.1 m/s

Heats
27 August

Heat 1
Wind: 1.2 m/s

Heat 2
Wind: 2 m/s

Heat 3
Wind: 0 m/s

Participation
According to an unofficial count, 21 athletes from 12 countries participated in the event.

 (2)
 (1)
 (3)
 (3)
 (1)
 (1)
 (1)
 (1)
 (3)
 (1)
 (2)
 (2)

References

100 metres hurdles
Sprint hurdles at the European Athletics Championships
1986 in women's athletics